Charlotte Eaton (born 14 May 1972) is a British television and stage actress. She is most known for her portrayal of Terri Dawson in the British sitcom, Benidorm.

Early life 
Eaton trained at The Court Theatre Training Company for two years from 1995 to 1997.

Career 
Eaton is most widely known for her role as Terri Dawson in ITV series, Benidorm but has previously had roles in Bad Girls, Doctor Who, Gambit, Doctors, Mrs Biggs and  Call the Midwife .

In 2015, Eaton joined the cast of Benidorm as Terri Dawson, the sister of already established character Clive Dyke (Perry Benson).

Eaton is also known for playing Jackie in two series of Witless.

References 

British actresses
Living people
1972 births